Greatest Hits? – Volume 1 is the first greatest hits album by American rock band Zebrahead, released March 11, 2015 exclusively in Japan. The album is followed by the lead single "Devil on My Shoulder", released March 26, 2015.

Background
In celebration of the 20th anniversary of the band's formation, Zebrahead announced the release of their first compilation album on February 5, 2015 for an exclusive release in Japan. A new track "Devil on My Shoulder" is included as the lead single, and several songs from the band's earlier years with former lead singer and rhythm guitarist, Justin Mauriello, is re-recorded with the co-lead vocalist at the time of recording and release, Matty Lewis.

Track listing

References

External links 

Zebrahead albums
Pop punk compilation albums
Punk rock compilation albums